Disguised Masters is a compilation album by the Norwegian avant-garde metal band Arcturus. The album has two new songs: "White Tie Black Noise" and "Deception Genesis". Other tracks are re-mixed versions of songs from La Masquerade Infernale and "Du Nordavind" from Aspera Hiems Symfonia.  Some songs received particularly significant overhauls, such as the gangsta rap version of "Master of Disguise".  Due to the significant changes to several of the band's songs, it is not a typical compilation album, and is therefore more suited to existing fans of the band than new listeners.

Track listing
"White Tie, Black Noise (Designed By When)" – 0:49
"Deception Genesis" – 6:35
"Du Nordavind (1998 Re-Recording)" – 3:54
"Alone (Intellecto / Valle Darktrip)" – 5:20
"The Throne of Tragedy (Phantom FX Jungle Remix)" – 6:49
"La Masquerade Infernale (Valle/Hellhammer Reconstruction)" – 2:23
"Master Of Disguise (Phantom FX Remix With 'Gangstafications' By S.C.N.)" – 4:25
"Painting My Horror (G. Wolf Levitation Mix)" – 5:37
"Ad Astra (The Magenta Experience)" – 4:39
"Ad Astra (Ensemble Version)" – 7:32

Personnel
 Kristoffer Rygg (credited as "G. Wolf") - vocals
 Knut Magne Valle - guitars
 Hugh Mingay (credited as "Skoll") - bass
 Steinar Sverd Johnsen (credited as "Sverd") - keyboards
 Jan Axel Blomberg (credited as "Hellhammer") - drums

References

Arcturus (band) albums
1999 remix albums